Ernest William Trickey (8 November 1933 – 13 May 2011) was an Australian rules footballer who played for the Fitzroy Football Club and South Melbourne Football Club in the Victorian Football League (VFL).

Notes

External links 

1933 births
2011 deaths
Australian rules footballers from Victoria (Australia)
Fitzroy Football Club players
Sydney Swans players